The 2018–19 Adelaide United FC season was the club's 15th season since its establishment in 2003. The club participated in the A-League for the 14th time and the FFA Cup for the 5th time.

Players

Squad information

Transfers

Transfers in

Transfers out

From youth squad

Contract extensions

Technical staff

Squad statistics

Appearances and goals

|-
|colspan="26"|Players no longer at the club

† = Scholarship or NPL/NYL-listed player

Pre-season and friendlies

Friendlies

Competitions

Overall

A-League

League table

Results summary

Results by round

Matches

Finals series

FFA Cup

References

External links
 Official Website

2018–19 A-League season by team
Adelaide United FC seasons